The Val Verde Battery was an artillery battery from Texas that served in the Confederate States Army during the American Civil War. At the Battle of Valverde on 21 February 1862, the Confederates captured five artillery pieces from Union forces. The Confederates formed an ad hoc battery which fought at Peralta. The artillery battery officially formed on 1 June 1862 at Fort Bliss. It later transferred to Louisiana where it helped capture the USS Diana and fought at Fort Bisland and Vermillion Bayou in 1863. The following year, the battery served at Mansfield and Pleasant Hill. After two old howitzers were replaced by two new captured guns, the unit fought at Monett's Ferry. At the end of the war in spring 1865, the soldiers buried their cannons. When the guns were dug up a few years later, the two new guns were the only ones that could be saved, and they have survived to this day.

See also
List of Texas Civil War Confederate units

Notes

References

 

Units and formations of the Confederate States Army from Texas
1862 establishments in Texas
1865 disestablishments in Texas
Military units and formations established in 1862